Hans Ehlers (15 July 1914 – 27 December 1944) was a German military aviator who served in the Luftwaffe during World War II. As a fighter ace, he was credited with 55—that is, 55 aerial combat encounters resulting in the destruction of the enemy aircraft—claimed in an unknown number of combat missions. He claimed eleven victories on the Eastern Front and 44 over the Western Allies, including 23 four-engine bombers.

Born in Hennstedt, Ehlers volunteered for service with the Condor Legion during the Spanish Civil War where he was assigned to the ground crew of Jagdgruppe 88 (J/88—88th Fighter Group). Following service in Spain, Ehlers was trained as a fighter pilot and posted to Jagdgeschwader 3 (JG 3—3rd Fighter Wing) He claimed his first aerial victory on 18 May 1940 during the Battle of France. He then fought in Battle of Britain and Operation Barbarossa, the invasion of the Soviet Union. Due to an organizational change, his unit became part of Jagdgeschwader 1 (JG 1—1st Fighter Wing) in early 1942 and was stationed on the Western Front and fighting in Defense of the Reich.

Ehlers was appointed Gruppenkommandeur (group commander) of I. Gruppe (1st group) of JG 1. On 9 June 1944, Ehlers was awarded the Knight's Cross of the Iron Cross and was killed in action on 27 December 1944, when he was shot down near Bereborn during the Battle of the Bulge.

Early life and career
Ehlers was born on 15 July 1914 in a Hennstedt, at the time in the Province of Schleswig-Holstein of the German Empire. He volunteered for service with the Condor Legion during the Spanish Civil War. There, Ehlers was a member of the groundstaff of 3. Staffel (3rd squadron) of Jagdgruppe 88 (J/88–88th Fighter Group), at the time under the command of Adolf Galland. For his service in Spain, he was awarded the Spanish Cross in Silver with Swords on 14 April 1939. Following his return from Spain, Ehlers received flight training at the pilot school in Salzwedel starting on 1 August. On 18 September, he transferred to the Jagdfliegerschule 1, the fighter pilot school at Werneuchen before he was posted to the Ergänzungs-Jagdgruppe Merseburg, a supplementary training unit based at Merseburg, on 16 November.

World War II
World War II in Europe began on Friday 1 September 1939 when German forces invaded Poland. On 7 December 1939, Ehlers was posted to the 2. Staffel of Jagdgeschwader 3 (JG 3—3rd Fighter Wing). At the time, the Staffel was based at Zerbst and commanded by Hauptmann Heinz Gärtner which was subordinated to I. Gruppe (1st group) headed by Hauptmann Günther Lützow. On 18 May 1940, during the Battle of France, Ehlers claimed his first aerial victories when he shot down a Royal Air Force (RAF) Supermarine Spitfire fighter and Hawker Hurricane fighter near Valenciennes. He in turn, was then shot down by RAF fighters on the same day and crash-landed his Messerschmitt Bf 109 E-1 south of Valenciennes and was initially listed as missing in action, rejoining his unit shortly later.

During the Battle of Britain, Ehlers was almost shot down in aerial combat with the RAF. His Bf 109 E-4 was damaged, resulting in a forced landing near Colembert. He claimed his first aerial victory of this battle on 26 August when he shot down a Spitfire west of Calais. On 5 September, I. Gruppe escorted 22 Dornier Do 17 light bombers to London where Ehlers claimed another Spitfire shot down. On 5 February 1941, the RAF flew "Circus" No. 3 targeting the airfield at Saint-Omer. That day, Ehlers claimed his fifth aerial victory over a Spitfire fighter shot down northwest of Saint-Omer.

War against the Soviet Union
In preparation for Operation Barbarossa, the German invasion of the Soviet Union, the I. Gruppe moved to an airfield at Dub on 18 June 1941. At the start of the campaign, JG 3 was subordinated to the V. Fliegerkorps (5th Air Corps), under command of General der Flieger Robert Ritter von Greim, which was part of Luftflotte 4 (4th Air Fleet), under command of Generaloberst Alexander Löhr. These air elements supported Generalfeldmarschall Gerd von Rundstedt's Heeresgruppe Süd (Army Group South), with the objective of capturing the Ukraine and its capital Kiev.

On 22 June, German forces invaded the Soviet Union. The Gruppe was tasked with suppressing aerial opposition the area of Lviv by attacking the Soviet airfields in that area. In total, I. Gruppe claimed 36 aircraft destroyed on the ground plus further 8 aerial victories on the first day, including a Polikarpov I-16 fighter by Ehlers. On 30 June, I. Gruppe moved to an airfield at Lutsk in northwestern Ukraine. That day, Ehlers was wounded in a takeoff accident at Lutsk which destroyed his Bf 109 F-2 (Werknummer 5708—factory number).  The cause of the accident was a ground collision with a Henschel Hs 126 air reconnaissance aircraft from 4. Staffel (Heer) of Aufklärungsgruppe 22  (22nd Reconnaissance Group). Following his convalescence, Ehlers claimed his next aerial victories during combat leading up to the Battle of Kiev. Fighting over the battle zones over Kyiv and Kaniv on 15 August, he claimed a I-17 fighter and a V-11 ground attack aircraft shot down. The I-17 was an early German wartime designation for the Mikoyan-Gurevich MiG-1 fighter, while the V-11 designator referred to the Ilyushin Il-2 ground attack aircraft.

On 26 August, I. Gruppe was moved to an forward airfield named Gubin located near the front at Hornostaipil. That day, Ehlers claimed a I-16 fighter, one of three aerial victories claimed by the Gruppe that day. Four days later, the Gruppe flew ten combat missions, two in support of Junkers Ju 87 dive-bombers and eight to protect the bridges crossing the Dnieper near Hornostaipil. Ehlers claimed an R-10 aircraft, referring to either a light bomber, biplane or a Seversky aircraft, and an I-17 fighter. On 16 September, the bulk of I. Gruppe was ordered back to Germany while 12 pilots and 40 men from the ground staff remained on the Eastern Front and were sent to either II. or III. Gruppe of JG 3. Ehlers was assigned to III. Gruppe and claimed an Il-2 ground attack aircraft on 11 October before returning to I. Gruppe.

Western Front

In September 1941, with the exception of 3. Staffel which followed in November, I. Gruppe of JG 3 was transferred from the Eastern Front to Germany for rest and re-supply. In November 1941, it was transferred to the northern Netherlands and on 15 January 1942 re-designated II. Gruppe of Jagdgeschwader 1 (JG 1—1st Fighter Wing) in Katwijk. In consequence, 1. Staffel of JG 3 became the 4. Staffel of JG 1, 2. Staffel of JG 3 became the 5. Staffel of JG 1, and 3. Staffel of JG 3 became the 6. Staffel of JG 1.

In May 1942, II. Gruppe was reequipped with the Focke Wulf Fw 190 A series, a radial engine powered fighter aircraft, at Woensdrecht Air Field. Ehlers claimed his first aerial victory flying the Fw 190 on 19 June. That day, 17 Fw 190s from 4. and 6. Staffel intercepted a flight of 24 Spitfire fighters in the area Zeebrugge. In this encounter, Ehlers claimed two Spitfires shot down. On 6 December, Ehlers claimed his first United States Army Air Forces (USAAF) heavy bomber shot down, his 17th aerial victory in total. That day, 66 Boeing B-17 Flying Fortress bombers headed for the industrials areas of Lille of which 37 bombed the target area.

On 22 January 1943, 15 to 20 North American B-25 Mitchell bombers escorted by Spitfire and North American P-51 Mustang fighters were intercepted by 10 Fw 190 from II. Gruppe over sea northwest of Blankenberge. On 11 March, Ehrler may have shot down a Spitfire fighter on an aerial reconnaissance mission. On 3 May, 16 Douglas A-20 Havoc bombers and 16 Lockheed Ventura bombers, escorted by 60 Spitfires and 40 Republic P-47 Thunderbolt fighters crossed the coast of Netherlands between 17:45 and 18:00. The Luftwaffe scrambled 24 Fw 190s from II. Gruppe of JG 1 and eight Bf 109s from 2. Staffel of Jagdgeschwader 27 (JG 27—27th Fighter Wing). Defending against this attack, Ehlers was credited with a Spitfire fighter and a Ventura bomber shot down. The Spitfire was piloted by Wing Commander Howard Blatchford who was killed in action.

Defense of the Reich

Ehlers was promoted to Leutnant (second lieutenant) on 1 July 1943. On 7 July, I. Gruppe of JG 1 moved to Deelen Air Field. The USAAF targeted the German aircraft industry on 17 August in the Schweinfurt–Regensburg mission. The bombers of the 1st Bombardment Wing headed for the ball bearing factories at Schweinfurt. At 11:50, the Luftwaffe fighters of I. Gruppe of JG 1 intercepted a large formation of B-17 bombers in the area of Aschaffenburg. Following the bombers on their southern heading, Ehlers shot down two B-17 bombers. That day, the commander of 2. Staffel of JG 1, Leutnant Hans Feustel, was wounded in combat. In consequence, Ehlers was appointed Staffelkapitän (squadron leader) of 2. Staffel the following day.

On 8 October, fying Fw 190 A-6 (Werknummer 530715), Ehlers rammed a B-17 bomber near Neuenhaus and Bentheim. That day, VIII Bomber Command had targeted Bremen and German ship building at Bremen-Vegesack. The aircraft rammed was the B-17 "Marie Helena" from the 351st Bombardment Squadron whose entire crew was killed in the collision. That day, JG 1 lost its commanding officer, Oberstleutnant Hans Philipp, who was killed in action. Two other pilots of 2. Staffel also spontaneously executed an unprecedented maneuver by ramming B-17 bombers that were returning westward from a raid against shipyards and factories in Bremen and Vegesack. All three Luftwaffe pilots survived, while all three of their targets were destroyed. This was the only significant ramming attack by Luftwaffe pilots until nearly the end of the war in 1945. 

On 23 October 1943, Reichsmarschall Hermann Göring, the Commander-in-Chief of the Luftwaffe, visited JG 1 at Deelen Air Field. During this visit, Ehlers was presented the German Cross in Gold by Göring. On 11 December, Ehlers succeeded Oberleutnant Rolf Strohal as Staffelkapitän of 3. Staffel of JG 1. Combat damaged sustained on 13 April 1944 resulted in a forced landing at Gutersdorf near Landshut. His Fw 190 A-8 (Werknummer 170046) was a total loss.

Group commander and death

On 17 April 1944, Ehlers was appointed Gruppenkommandeur (group commander) of I. Gruppe of JG 1, succeeding Major Rudolf-Emil Schnoor. Ehlers claimed his first aerial victory as Gruppenkommandeur on 13 May. That day 289 B-17 bombers from the 1st Bomb Division headed for oil targets in western Poland while 261 Consolidated B-24 Liberator bombers from the 2nd Bomb Division attacked the Focke-Wulf factories at Tutow. Further 199 B-17 bombers of the 3rd Bomb Division attacked railroad targets near Osnabrück. This attack force was escorted by 1,107 fighter aircraft. JG 1 was sent to intercept the bombers of the 1st Bomb Division but were engaged by the escorting fighters over the Bay of Lübeck. During this aerial battle, Ehlers claimed a P-47 fighter shot down.

Two days later, VIII Bomber Command sent almost 900 bombers to Berlin and Braunschweig. JG 1 intercepted the bombers near Rheine/Osnabrück. On this mission, Ehlers claimed a B-24 bomber destroyed. On 6 June, Allied forced launched the Normandy landings. At 05:00, Ehlers received the order to relocate to France. That day, I. Gruppe left the airfield at Bad Lippspringe and relocated to Le Mans Airfield. Ehlers was awarded the Knight's Cross of the Iron Cross on 9 June 1944. In September, I. Gruppe relocated back to Germany. During the period associated with Operation Overlord (6 June – 30 August 1944), the Gruppe claimed 50 aerial victories for the loss of 34 pilots killed, 3 taken prisoner of war, and further 13 wounded.

On 21 November, 421 B-17 bombers of the 1st Bomb Division attacked the Leuna works. According to Mathews and Foreman, Ehlers shot down a B-17 bomber that day. This claim is not listed by Prien and Rodeike. Ehlers claimed his last aerial victory on 25 December when approximately 400 B-17 and B-24 bombers attacked German communication and transportation centers in western Germany. I. Gruppe intercepted the bombers from the 2nd Bomb Division around St. Vith/Bastogne where for the loss of one of their own seven B-24 bombers were claimed, including one by Ehlers. On 27 December 1944, Ehlers led a flight of 18 Fw 190s on a mission to cover ground troops in the Dinant-Rochefort area during the Battle of the Bulge. On the approach to the target, they were intercepted by P-51 fighters of the USAAF 364th Fighter Group west of Mayen. Ehlers was shot down and killed in action in his Fw 190 A-8 (Werknummer 739363) near Bereborn. Ehlers had ignored the warnings of his fellow pilots and only three pilots returned from this mission. He was succeeded by Hauptmann Georg Hackbarth as commander of I. Gruppe.

Summary of career

Aerial victory claims
According to Obermaier, Ehlers was credited with 55 aerial victories claimed in an unknown number of combat missions. This figure includes eleven claims on the Eastern Front and 44 over the Western Allies, including 23 four-engine bombers. Mathews and Foreman, authors of Luftwaffe Aces — Biographies and Victory Claims, researched the German Federal Archives and found records for 48 aerial victory claims, plus two further unconfirmed claims. This figure of confirmed claims includes nine aerial victories on the Eastern Front and 39 on the Western Front, including 22 four-engine bombers.

Victory claims were logged to a map-reference (PQ = Planquadrat), for example "PQ 05 Ost S/RT-8". These sectors were then subdivided into 36 smaller units to give a location area 3 × 4 km in size.

Awards
 Spanish Cross in Silver with Swords (14 April 1939)
 German Cross in Gold on 24 October 1943 as Leutnant in the II./Jagdgeschwader 1
 Knight's Cross of the Iron Cross on 9 June 1944 as Oberleutnant and Staffelkapitän of the 3./Jagdgeschwader 1 "Oesau"
Ehlers was nominated for the posthumous Knight's Cross of the Iron Cross with Oak Leaves. This nomination was not approved.

Notes

References

Citations

Bibliography

 
 
 
 
 
 
 
 
 
 
 
 
 
 
 
 
 
 
 
 
 
 
 
 
 
 

1914 births
1940s missing person cases
1944 deaths
Aviators killed by being shot down
Condor Legion personnel
German World War II flying aces
Luftwaffe personnel killed in World War II
People from the Province of Schleswig-Holstein
German military personnel of the Spanish Civil War
Missing in action of World War II
Military personnel from Schleswig-Holstein
Recipients of the Gold German Cross
Recipients of the Knight's Cross of the Iron Cross